La Hoja Digital is a newspaper published in Paraguay.

External links
La Hoja Digital

Newspapers published in Paraguay